The 1964–65 SM-sarja season was the 34th season of the SM-sarja, the top level of ice hockey in Finland. 10 teams participated in the league, and Karhut Pori won the championship.

Regular season

Final
 Karhut Pori - Ilves Tampere 5:1

External links
 Season on hockeyarchives.info

Fin
Liiga seasons
SM